The Plain is a name for the moderate party in the French Revolution.

The Plain may also refer to:
The Plain (band), American 1990s rock band
The Plain, Oxford, junction in Oxford, England
The Plain (West Point), parade ground at United States Military Academy

See also
The Plains (disambiguation)
Cities of the Plain (disambiguation)